Jean Nelissen (3 June 1924 – 6 July 2005) was a Belgian footballer. He played in five matches for the Belgium national football team in 1957.

References

1924 births
2005 deaths
Belgian footballers
Belgium international footballers
Place of birth missing
Association footballers not categorized by position